Morris Hood Jr. (June 5, 1934 – October 7, 1998) was a Democratic member of the Michigan House of Representatives, representing part of Detroit from 1971 until his death in 1998.

Early life 
Born in Detroit in 1934, Hood served in the United States Army and attended Wayne State University.

Career 
In 1970, he was elected to the House, and was re-elected 14 times. (His last term was the last he could have served under Michigan's term limits.) While in the House, Hood chaired the Appropriations Committee.

Hood served as a delegate to four Democratic National Conventions.

Hood was a forceful champion of education for the underserved as well as for mental health services.  His tenacity and consistent views made him a very effective legislator. The decision that he would lay in state in the Capitol at his death was testimony to the esteem of his legislative colleagues.

He was the primary founder of the King-Chavez-Parks Initiative scholarship program.

Personal life 
Hood died of a heart attack on October 7, 1998. His body lay in state in the Capitol rotunda, the first legislator to receive the honor.

Hood's brother Raymond W. Hood, and his son Morris Hood III, also both served in the Michigan Legislature.

References

1934 births
1998 deaths
Burials in Michigan
Politicians from Detroit
Military personnel from Michigan
Democratic Party members of the Michigan House of Representatives
Wayne State University alumni
20th-century American politicians